Craig Leonard Heatley  (born 29 May 1956) is a New Zealand businessman, entrepreneur and philanthropist. He is one of the wealthiest men in New Zealand according to the New Zealand National Business Review. His net worth is estimated to be $550 million.

Career
Heatley set up Rainbow Corporation in the 1980s which had interests in Woolworths supermarkets, entertainment theme parks and property. Rainbow was acquired by Brierley Investments in the late 80's to gain control of Rainbows significant stake in Woolworths. Rainbow shareholders agreed to a stock swap deal worth $500 million, of which Heatley controlled 20%. Heatley was appointed to the Brierley board.

He then went on to set up Sky Network Television, Famously with a personal investment of only $1, he managed to turn it into New Zealand's only pay TV provider and one of the 10 largest New Zealand companies, whilst still retaining a 15% stake.

Heatley has since sold his stake in Sky Network Television, and now has diversified interests throughout New Zealand, Asia and the U.S. which include property, infrastructure, equities and aviation. He is also a major player in the New Zealand private equity and currency markets.

In the 2013 Queen's Birthday Honours, Heatley was appointed a Companion of the New Zealand Order of Merit, for services to business.

Other
He was born in Lower Hutt and educated at Heretaunga College and the Victoria University of Wellington.

A keen avatior he is one of a very few New Zealanders to own their own private jet, a $30m Bombardier Global. He owns several properties in New Zealand (including a private island) and the United States.

Heatley is a competitive amateur golfer who won the 2003 AT&T Pebble Beach National Pro-Am at Pebble Beach with professional golfer Phil Tataurangi, and the 2004 Alfred Dunhill Links Championship pro-am with professional golfer Fred Couples. He is a member of Augusta National Golf Club where he is Chairman of the Masters Tournament Media Committee.

References

External links
Douglas Myers, Craig Heatley mansions touted to foreigners
Heatley page at Ocean Partners

1956 births
Living people
New Zealand businesspeople
Companions of the New Zealand Order of Merit
People from Lower Hutt